A closet drama is a play that is not intended to be performed onstage, but read by a solitary reader or sometimes out loud in a large group. The contrast between closet drama and classic "stage" dramas dates back to the late eighteenth century. The literary historian Henry A. Beers considers closet drama "a quite legitimate product of literary art."

Definition 
A closet drama (or closet play) is a play created primarily for reading, rather than production. Closet dramas are traditionally defined in narrower terms as belonging to a genre of dramatic writing unconcerned with stage technique. Stageability is only one aspect of closet drama: historically, playwrights might choose the genre of 'closet' dramatic writing to avoid censorship of their works, for example in the case of political tragedies. Closet drama has also been used as a mode of dramatic writing for those without access to the commercial playhouse, and in this context has become closely associated with early modern women's writing. Closet dramas were published in manuscript form, including dramatis personae and elaborate stage directions, allowing readers to imagine the text as if it were being performed. This created an "unusually tight fusion between book and reader as it endeavours to stimulate the theatrical imagination." The playwrights did not have to worry about the pressure to impress an audience due to their audience being whom they chose. Thus, it was considered to be a freeing style of writing.

Marta Straznicky describes the form as "part of a larger cultural matrix in which closed spaces, selective interpretive communities, and political dissent are aligned." Print is the crucial factor behind closet dramas: "a play that is not intended for commercial performance can nevertheless cross between private playreading and the public sphere" through this medium.

History
The philosophical dialogues of ancient Greek and Roman writers such as Plato (see Socratic dialogue) were written in the form of conversations between "characters" and are in this respect similar to closet drama, many of which feature little action but are often rich in philosophical rhetoric.

Beginning with Friedrich von Schlegel, many have argued that the tragedies of Seneca the Younger in the first century AD were written to be recited at small parties rather than performed. Although that theory has become widely pervasive in the history of theater, there is no evidence to support the contention that Seneca's plays were intended to be read or recited at small gatherings of the wealthy. The emperor Nero, a pupil of Seneca, may have performed in some of them. Some of the drama of the Middle Ages was of the closet-drama type, such as the drama of Hroswitha of Gandersheim and debate poems in quasi-dramatic form.

Elizabethan and Jacobean 
Fulke Greville, Samuel Daniel, Sir William Alexander, and Mary Sidney wrote closet dramas in the age of Shakespeare and Jonson.

Between 1642 and 1660, the English government banned public performance. During this time, playreading became a "substitute" for playgoing. Thus, playwrights were moved to take on "propagandist aims" against parliament and topics beyond the theatre in their writing, meaning reading such work could be considered a revolutionary act. However, playwrights could write in relative security, protected by the anonymous means of print. Thomas Killigrew is an example of a stage playwright who turned to closet drama when his plays could no longer be produced during this period; he was in exile from England during the English Civil War.

Following the Restoration in 1660, some authors continued to favour closet drama, proving that the form "served a cultural function distinct from that of commercial drama." John Milton's play Samson Agonistes, written in 1671, is an example of early modern drama never intended for the stage.

Nineteenth century 
Several closet dramas in verse were written in Europe after 1800; these plays were by and large inspired by classical models. Faust, Part 1 and Faust, Part 2 by Johann Wolfgang von Goethe, among the most acclaimed pieces in the history of German literature, were written as closet dramas, though both plays have been frequently staged. Lord Byron, Percy Bysshe Shelley, and Alexander Pushkin devoted much time to the closet drama.

The popularity of closet drama at this time was both a sign of, and a reaction to, the decline of the verse tragedy on the European stage in the 1800s. Popular tastes in theater were shifting toward melodrama and comedy and there was little commercial appeal in staging verse tragedies (though Coleridge, Robert Browning, and others wrote verse dramas that were staged in commercial theaters). Playwrights who wanted to write verse tragedy had to resign themselves to writing for readers, rather than actors and audiences. Nineteenth-century closet drama became a longer poetic form, without the connection to practical theater and performance.

Women in closet drama 
In the early modern period, women writers who were unable to "use their voice" in public were able to emphasize their opinions using the form of closet drama. This outlet for communication provided a woman the ability to "engage in political discourse without exposing her views to an indiscriminate public," since she could choose to restrict her readership. However, women's writing could be influenced by societal pressures and occurrences.

Margaret Lucas Cavendish, author of fourteen folio volumes,  explored writing closet dramas during her exile and became one of the best known women playwrights due to her interest in philosophical nature. Although living in relative oppression, women dealt with the risks of public shame and rejection in the effort to have their writing recognized.

Other notable women involved in a closet drama include Anne Finch, Jane Lumley, and Elizabeth Cary.

See also 
 Radio drama
 Readers theater
 Verse drama and dramatic verse

References

 
Drama
Theatre
Literary genres